Leonor Tomásia de Távora, 3rd Marchioness of Távora (15 March 1700 - 13 January 1759, Lisbon) was a Portuguese noblewoman, most notable for being one of those executed during the Távora affair.

Life 
Leonor Tomásia de Távora was born on 15 March 1700 to Luís Bernardo de Távora, 5th Count of São João da Pesqueira, and Ana de Lorena, daughter of Nuno Álvares Pereira de Melo, 1st Duke of Cadaval.
She had thirteen children with Francisco de Assis de Távora, 3rd Count of Alvor, but only four survived:
 Luís Bernardo de Távora, married without issue;
 Leonor de Lorena e Távora, who had issue:
Leonor de Almeida Portugal, 4th Marquise of Alorna
Pedro de Almeida Portugal, 3rd Marquis of Alorna
Maria de Almeida Portugal.

Bibliography
  Távora, Luíz de Lencastre. D. Leonor de Távora. O Tempo da Ira. O Processo dos Távora. Quetzal Editores. 2002

1700 births
1759 deaths
Portuguese nobility
People executed by Portugal by decapitation
Executed Portuguese people
Marchionesses
18th-century Portuguese people
18th-century executions by Portugal